St Francis Bay is a holiday town in Sarah Baartman District Municipality in the Eastern Cape province of South Africa, roughly one hour’s drive from Gqeberha.

On 11 November 2012 a fire destroyed 76 homes, almost all of them thatched roofed.

The building style of the village section of St Francis Bay includes white painted houses with black roofs (mostly thatch) on the canals or around the golf course, or a Mediterranean building style in Santareme and Port St Francis. The Kromme River is navigable for 14 km upstream, and is linked to the St Francis canals system.

Whales can be spotted in the Bay from May to late October and dolphins can be seen daily on their way back and forth between the bays of Cape St Francis and Jeffrey’s Bay. The Cape clawless otter is also ever present, frolicking in the waves and rock pools around Port St Francis and at Otters Landing. Bird life is abundant with over 200 species recorded in the area including the rare African oystercatcher and fish eagle.

Port St Francis includes a commercial and recreational harbour, built to host the squid industry freezing vessels, as well as a small harbour resort village.  It lies in a sheltered nook of the bay and provides a safe anchorage for the boats, pleasure craft, and oceangoing yachts. St Francis Field is an airpark close to the Port that caters for those who wish to fly in.

Cape St Francis, a rustic fishing village, sits adjacent to St Francis Bay. Popular for surfing at Seal Point, its beautiful stretch of beach and the historic lighthouse, built in 1878. Walking trails wind along the rocky coast, through the Irma Booysen Floral Reserve, and along the Cape St Francis point links it to the village of St Francis Bay.

Cape St Francis is 8 km from Thyspunt, which was a preferred site for South Africa's next nuclear power station there is also a township known as Sea Visa where most of the black Africans and coloured people live.

References

External links

 
 Residents Association
 St Francis Bay
 St Francis Bay Webcam

Populated places in the Kouga Local Municipality
Populated coastal places in South Africa
Surfing locations in South Africa